Francisco Albarracín (born March 10, 1985 in La Plata) is an Argentine rugby union player. He plays as a scrum-half.

He made his debut for Argentina against Chile in 2007. In May 2010, he was selected in a squad of over 40 players to represent Argentina in the two test Summer tour of Argentina.

External links
 Argentina profile
scrum.com
rugbyfun.com.ar

1985 births
Living people
Sportspeople from La Plata
Rugby union scrum-halves
Argentine rugby union players
Argentina international rugby union players
La Plata Rugby Club players
Pampas XV players